Bokeh Kosang (born 26 July 1980) is a Taiwanese actor and singer of Truku ethnicity.

He is noted for his roles as Hanaoka Ichiro in the film Seediq Bale, which earned him a Supporting Actor Award at the 46th Golden Bell Awards.

Early life
Bokeh Kosang was born and raised in Wanrong Township of Hualien County, Taiwan. He graduated from Chinese Culture University, majoring in vocal music.

Career
Bokeh Kosang first rose to prominence in 2011 for playing Hanaoka Ichiro in the film Seediq Bale. The film reached number one in the ratings when it aired in Taiwan.

Filmography

Film

Television

Single
 The Rainbow Promise
 MQA-RAS

Awards and nominations

References

External links
 
 
 
 
 
 

1980 births
People from Hualien County
Living people
Truku people
Taiwanese male film actors
Taiwanese male television actors
Chinese Culture University alumni